Judith Sewell Wright is an American author, speaker, lifestyles expert and life coach.

Soft addiction
Wright coined the term "soft addiction" in 1991. Soft addictions are defined as addictions that are harmful to an individual’s life but not potentially fatal, such as overeating or procrastinating. Hard addictions are those addictions, like alcohol or drug addiction, which can be fatal.

Personal life
Wright was born in Flint, Michigan and was valedictorian of her high school class. Wright received a BA in psychology, MA in education and counseling, and Ed.D. in
Educational Leadership and Change. She lives in Chicago with her husband Dr. Robert "Bob" Wright.

Wright's license was not renewed in 2001 during the appeal of an Illinois lawsuit ruling that she and her husband, as professionals regulated by the Illinois Department of Professional Regulation (IDPR), used their position to promote private business ventures unregulated by the IDPR to clients in 2000. In a decision by the Illinois First District Appellate Court, the Wrights argued that the suit should be overturned on the basis that their professional licenses had been allowed to lapse, leaving them outside IDPR jurisdiction, to which the appellate court concurred, reversing the decision in 2002.

Bibliography
Transformed! : The Science of Spectacular Living (2013)
The Soft Addiction Solution: Break Free Of The Seemingly Harmless Habits That Keep You From The Life You Want (2006)
There Must Be More Than This: Finding More Life, Love, and Meaning by Overcoming Your Soft Addictions (2003)
The One Decision : Make The Single Choice That Will Lead To A Life of More (2005)

References

American women writers
Living people
Writers from Flint, Michigan
Year of birth missing (living people)
21st-century American women